Kamdi may refer to:

Kamdi, Banke, Nepal
Kamdi, Kaski, Nepal